Sherman County is the name of four counties in the United States:

 Sherman County, Kansas
 Sherman County, Nebraska
 Sherman County, Oregon
 Sherman County, Texas